The Bibliographical Society of London deals with the study of the book and its history in the United Kingdom.

Bibliographical Society may also refer to:
 Bibliographical Society of America
 Bibliographical Society of Australia and New Zealand; see Dietrich Borchardt
 Bibliographical Society of Canada/La Société bibliographique du Canada; see Douglas Lochhead

 Bibliographical Society of the University of Virginia
 Cambridge Bibliographical Society; see Timeline of Cambridge
 Glasgow Bibliographical Society; see Sylvia Murray
 Edinburgh Bibliographical Society; see Oliphant, Anderson and Ferrier
 Oxford Bibliographical Society, co-founded by Strickland Gibson
 Welsh Bibliographical Society